Debra Baptist-Estrada is Director of the Immigration Department in Belize. In 2016 she received the International Women of Courage Award. In 2019 she became the Director of the Immigration Department.

Work 
Estrada has an associate degree and she became Port Commander of Philip S. W. Goldson International Airport which is international airport for Belize City. She started work in the airport's immigration department in the mid 1990s.  In 2015 she discovered a smuggling organization that was of interest to US authorities as they were smuggling drugs and people to the United States and Europe.  She then worked on security at the Belize's northern border. Estrada was an immigration officer at the Santa Elena Border in Corozal. She continued to refuse bribes and enforce the immigration laws. She has "consistently refused bribes and other incentives to look the other way."

In 2016 she was invited to Washington where she received the International Women of Courage Award from the US Secretary of State John Kerry. The award has been given since 2007 and it recognises women leaders. The award is made on the 8 March (International Women's Day). After the award the 14 awardees gave talks and then met again on 1 April.

In 2019 she was approved by the Cabinet in Belize as the new Director of the Immigration Department. The appointment was made despite there being better academically qualified candidates. It was noted that some of her colleagues had in the past had US visas refused whereas Estrada was recognised by the United States Embassy for her integrity. She would move from the nationality section to take over from Diana Locke.

The following year immigration became a major issue when in March Belizeans returned to their country due to the COVID-19 pandemic. Baptist-Estrada assured all of those abroad that they would be welcome to return, but their health would be checked and they would be asked to self-isolate.

References 

Living people
Belizean women
Recipients of the International Women of Courage Award
Immigration to South America
Year of birth missing (living people)